Anna Linkova (born 22 January 1977) is a former Russian tennis player.

Linkova won one singles and one doubles title on the ITF tour in her career. On 27 January 1997, she reached her best singles ranking of world number 338. On 21 July 1997, she peaked at world number 247 in the doubles rankings.

Linkova made her WTA tour debut at the 1995 Moscow Ladies Open – Doubles.

ITF finals (2–16)

Singles (1–2)

Doubles (1–14)

External links 
 
 

1977 births
Living people
Russian female tennis players
20th-century Russian women
21st-century Russian women